Sigfrid Oskar "Sigge" Lindberg (25 March 1897 – 4 January 1977) was a Swedish association football goalkeeper who won a bronze medal at the 1924 Summer Olympics. Between 1921 and 1930 he played 49 international matches.

References

1897 births
1977 deaths
Swedish footballers
Footballers at the 1924 Summer Olympics
Olympic footballers of Sweden
Olympic bronze medalists for Sweden
Sweden international footballers
Olympic medalists in football
Medalists at the 1924 Summer Olympics
Association football goalkeepers
Sportspeople from Helsingborg